Járol Herrera Martínez (born 26 May 1984) is a Colombian footballer who plays as a midfielder for Dominican club Atlético Vega Real.

Honors
Deportivo Cali
 Categoría Primera A: Finalización 2005

Trujillanos
 Venezuelan Primera División: Apertura 2014

Atlético Pantoja
 Liga Dominicana de Fútbol: 2019

References

External links

 
 
 
 

1984 births
Living people
Colombian footballers
Sportspeople from Cartagena, Colombia
Association football midfielders
Deportivo Cali footballers
Atlético Huila footballers
Monagas S.C. players
Cúcuta Deportivo footballers
Trujillanos FC players
Aragua FC players
Atlético Pantoja players
Atlético Vega Real players
Categoría Primera A players
Venezuelan Primera División players
Liga Dominicana de Fútbol players
Colombian expatriate footballers
Expatriate footballers in Venezuela
Colombian expatriate sportspeople in Venezuela
Expatriate footballers in the Dominican Republic
Colombian expatriate sportspeople in the Dominican Republic